St Ives is a parliamentary constituency covering the western end of Cornwall and the Isles of Scilly. The constituency has been represented in the House of Commons of the UK Parliament since 2015 by Derek Thomas, a Conservative MP.

The area's voters produced the 22nd closest result in the 2017 general election; a winning margin of 312 votes. Since 1992, the same locally leading two parties' candidates who were fielded (varying at different times) have won at least 27.2% of the vote each; the third placed candidate, that of the Labour Party, has fluctuated between 8.2% and 15.2% of share of the vote.

Constituency profile
The seat covers the southern end of Cornwall and the Isles of Scilly. Tourism is a significant sector in this former mining area.

History
St Ives has elected MPs to every Parliament since 1558, except for a brief period during the Protectorate. It was originally a mere parliamentary borough that returned two MPs until the Great Reform Act of 1832, when its representation was cut to a single member. In 1885 the borough was abolished, but the St Ives name was transferred to the surrounding county constituency.

St Ives borough
The borough established under Queen Mary consisted of the parish of St Ives in western Cornwall, a seaport and market town in which the main economic interests were fishing and the export of ores mined nearby. In 1831, the population of the borough was 4,776, and contained 1,002 houses.

The franchise was initially restricted to the town corporation, but after a judgment in a disputed election in 1702 the right to vote was given to all inhabitants paying scot and lot; in the early 19th century this amounted to a little over 300 voters. This was a wide franchise for the period, and its reasonable size meant that St Ives was one of the few Cornish boroughs that could claim not to be rotten.

Elections were usually contested. Local wealthiest families were able to exercise considerable influence on the outcome yet none was predominant. The result could rarely be taken for granted and it was necessary to court the voters assiduously. From the 17th century were three such families from the first: the Hobart family, the Praeds (at the time of Treventhoe manor), and the Dukes of Bolton (the Paulet family)  – to which added by the mid 18th century the Stephens family. In 1751, however, John Stephens, who had previously allied himself with the Earl of Buckinghamshire (a Hobart) and managed the borough's elections on his behalf, "struck out on his own account" (defected independently) and secured the election of his son. Later in the decade Stephens and the Earl once more began to work together, but were unable to prevent Humphrey Mackworth Praed from establishing sufficient influence to sway one of the two seats.

By 1761 alliances coalesced, the Earl and Praed on one side nominating candidates against Stephens and the Duke of Bolton on the other. The by-election in 1763, when Buckinghamshire's brother-in-law Charles Hotham was re-elected after being appointed to a position in the Royal Household, cost the Earl £1,175 including 7 guineas each to 124 people, resulting in an uncontested election.

There was a further bitterly contested election in 1774: allegations of bribery were investigated by a House of Commons committee, whose proceedings are recounted at length by the contemporary historian of electoral abuses, Thomas Oldfield. Samuel Stephens, defeated by 7 votes, accused William Praed and Adam Drummond (the Duke of Bolton's candidate) of benefiting from several types of corruption. Humphrey Mackworth Praed, William's father, was said to have lent large sums to voters on the understanding that repayment would not be demanded if they voted for Praed and Drummond; but opposing counsel adduced evidence that Stephens had also resorted to bribery. However, it was alleged that many of Stephens' supporters had been prevented from voting, by rating them as not liable for scot and lot and so not eligible to vote; this disenfranchisement was a frequent abuse in such boroughs.  His side, as petitioners, failed to bring any evidence of criminal misconduct by the parish overseers so the committee decided they had no jurisdiction to interfere. In the end, the committee upheld Drummond's election and declared that neither Stephens nor Praed had been properly elected, thus a writ was issued for a by-election to fill the second seat.

The cost of electioneering in St Ives seems eventually to have led to Buckinghamshire and Bolton withdrawing, and by 1784 Praed was considered unchallenged as patron. Nevertheless, Stephens' influence was not extinguished, and it was recorded that the patrons at the time of the Reform Act were Samuel Stephens of Tregarron and Sir Christopher Hawkins of Trewithan (who had purchased the manor of Mr Praed).

The Reform Act extended the boundaries, bringing in the neighbouring parishes of Lelant and Towednack and reduced the two St Ives seats to one. A new high of 584 voters qualified at the first reformed election, that of 1832.

On extension of the franchise in 1868 of the "second Reform Act", the electorate never passed 1,500, and had fallen to barely 1,000 by the Redistribution of Seats Act 1885, the cornerstone of the third reform legislation, under which the "borough" for its parliamentary definition was abolished that year, the area becoming contributory to a larger county division.

St Ives county constituency
1885–1918
Division of counties into single-member constituencies was effected in 1885: Cornwall having six. The westernmost of these, in which St Ives stood, was formally The Western or St Ives Division of Cornwall but was most often referred to simply as St Ives or as West Cornwall.

This area included Penzance, Paul, Ludgvan and St Just, and stretched not only from Land's End to St Erth but also included the Isles of Scilly. This duchy seat was abnormally low in owner-occupiers, with many "nonconformist" Christians and the Conservatives were consequently very weak. However, local sentiment was strongly against Irish Home Rule or independence, seen as a particular threat to the livelihood of the fishermen and other maritime employees who made up much of the electorate, and St Ives therefore became a Liberal Unionist stronghold from 1886.

1918–1983
After the boundary revisions introduced at the general election of 1918, which brought in most of the villages on the Lizard Peninsula (though not Helston), the constituency was simply called Cornwall, St Ives. It underwent further boundary changes in 1950, bringing Helston into the constituency, and in 1983, when it was extended to include all of the Penwith local government district.

The character of the constituency was little changed any of these revisions, but party loyalties may have been disrupted by the 1918 changes. Labour put up a candidate for the first time in 1918, and took more than a third of the vote; at the next election, with Labour withdrawing and the Irish issue no longer able to help Cory, a Conservative was elected for the first time. For the next decade St Ives was a Conservative-Liberal marginal, changing hands four times in the 1920s. However, the formal split of National Liberals from the Liberals offered a popular compromise which suited the voters, so much so as to be a safe seat, and later for Conservatives when the National Liberals finally merged with them in the 1960s, until the formation of the Liberal Democrats re-invigorated the competition in the 1990s.  Andrew George captured the seat after the retirement of the sitting Conservative MP in 1997, and took over half the vote in both 2001 and 2005.

Prominent members
1885–date
Walter Runciman held the most senior positions in Education, Agriculture and Trade taking together the period from 1908 until 1916 during the Asquith ministry.  He was later re-appointed as the most senior minister in Trade from 1931 to 1937 in the all-party National Coalition Government.

Sir John Nott also held the most senior position in the Trade department before becoming Secretary of State for Defence, including during the Argentine invasion of the Falkland Islands and the ensuing Falklands War.  His assertion that he was cutting the defence budget before the war was not capricious and he offered his resignation to Margaret Thatcher, however she kept him for the duration of the conflict and he stood down in 1983.

Usual late count in modern elections
At general elections, the constituency is usually one of the last to declare a result - the delay in bringing the ballot boxes over from the Isles of Scilly means that counting does not begin until the following day. In the 2015 general election it was the last constituency in the United Kingdom to declare, because the ballot boxes were flown in from the Isles of Scilly only on the first scheduled flight the following morning, having been kept in police cells overnight on St Mary's, with the declaration taking place at 15:30 on Friday afternoon. However, in 1987 and 1992 the constituency did count during the night rather than the next day. The seat was declared at about 1:30 am in 1987 and about 3:45 am in 1992. In 2019 it was planned to fly the ballot boxes in overnight, but bad weather prevented this and the seat was the last to declare in the UK.

Boundaries

1885–1918: The Boroughs of St Ives and Penzance, the Sessional Division of West Penwith (including the Isles of Scilly), and the parishes of St Erth and Uny-Lelant.

1918–1950: The Boroughs of St Ives and Penzance, the Urban Districts of Ludgvan, Madron, Paul, and St Just, the Rural District of West Penwith, the Isles of Scilly, and part of the Rural District of Helston.

1950–1983: The Boroughs of St Ives, Penzance, and Helston, the Urban District of St Just, the Isles of Scilly, and parts of the Rural Districts of Kerrier and West Penwith.

1983–2010: The District of Penwith, the District of Kerrier wards of Breage and Germoe, Crowan, Grade-Ruan and Landewednack, Helston North, Helston South, Meneage, Mullion, Porthleven, St Keverne and Wendron, and Sithney, and the Isles of Scilly.

2010–present: The District of Penwith wards of Goldsithney, Gulval and Heamoor, Lelant and Carbis Bay, Ludgvan and Towednack, Madron and Zennor, Marazion and Perranuthnoe, Morvah, Pendeen and St Just, Penzance Central, Penzance East, Penzance Promenade, Penzance South, St Buryan, St Erth and St Hilary, St Ives North, and St Ives South, the District of Kerrier wards of Breage and Crowan, Grade-Ruan and Landewednack, Helston North, Helston South, Meneage, Mullion, Porthleven and Sithney, and St Keverne, and the Isles of Scilly.

The St Ives constituency covers the southwest of Cornwall, taking in the most southerly and westerly points of England (both its mainland and if islands are included), taking in parts of the former Penwith and Kerrier Districts. The main towns in the constituency are Penzance, St Ives and Helston. It also includes the Isles of Scilly, not shown on the map (having 1,700 electors out of a total of 63,000). The seat includes the Tate St Ives, St Michael's Mount (also an island) and Land's End.

Following the Boundary Commission' Fifth Periodic Review of Westminster constituencies, Parliament increased the number of seats in the county from five to six for the 2010 general election, thus St Ives saw a loss of wards to the new Camborne and Redruth seat, including the St Ives Bay town of Hayle.

Members of Parliament

1558–1629

1640–1832

1832–1885

Since 1885

Elections

Elections in the 2010s

Elections in the 2000s

Elections in the 1990s

Elections in the 1980s

Elections in the 1970s

Elections in the 1960s

Elections in the 1950s

Elections in the 1940s

General election 1939–40:
Another general election was required to take place before the end of 1940. The political parties had been making preparations for an election to take place from 1939 and by the end of this year, the following candidates had been selected;
Liberal National:  Alec Beechman
Liberal:
Labour:

Elections in the 1930s

Elections in the 1920s

Elections in the 1910s

General election 1914–15:
Another general election was required to take place before the end of 1915. The political parties had been making preparations for an election to take place and by July 1914, the following candidates had been selected;
Liberal: Clifford Cory
Unionist: Anthony Hawke

Elections in the 1900s

Elections in the 1890s

Elections in the 1880s

 Caused by St. Aubyn's elevation to the peerage, becoming Lord St. Levan.

 Caused by Reed's death.

Elections in the 1870s

 Caused by the previous by-election being declared void on petition, on grounds of "general treating".

 Caused by Davenport's death.

Elections in the 1860s

Elections in the 1850s

Elections in the 1840s

 Caused by Praed's death.

Elections in the 1830s

 Caused by Halse's death

See also

List of parliamentary constituencies in Cornwall

Notes

References

Sources

 F. W. S. Craig, British Parliamentary Election Results 1832 - 1885
 F. W. S. Craig, British Parliamentary Election Results 1885 - 1918
 Election results, 1950 - 2005
 Robert Beatson, A Chronological Register of Both Houses of Parliament (London: Longman, Hurst, Res & Orme, 1807) A Chronological Register of Both Houses of the British Parliament, from the Union in 1708, to the Third Parliament of the United Kingdom of Great Britain and Ireland, in 1807
 D. Brunton & D. H. Pennington, Members of the Long Parliament (London: George Allen & Unwin, 1954)
 Cobbett's Parliamentary history of England, from the Norman Conquest in 1066 to the year 1803 (London: Thomas Hansard, 1808) titles A-Z
 Michael Kinnear, The British Voter (London: BH Batsford, Ltd, 1968)
 Lewis Namier & John Brooke, The History of Parliament: The House of Commons 1754-1790 (London: HMSO, 1964)
 J. E. Neale, The Elizabethan House of Commons (London: Jonathan Cape, 1949)
 T. H. B. Oldfield, The Representative History of Great Britain and Ireland (London: Baldwin, Cradock & Joy, 1816)
 Henry Pelling, Social Geography of British Elections 1885-1910 (London: Macmillan, 1967)
 J Holladay Philbin, Parliamentary Representation 1832 - England and Wales (New Haven: Yale University Press, 1965)
 Edward Porritt and Annie G. Porritt, The Unreformed House of Commons (Cambridge University Press, 1903)
  
 Frederic A. Youngs Jr., Guide to the Local Administrative Units of England, Vol I (London: Royal Historical Society, 1979)

Parliamentary constituencies in Cornwall
St Ives, Cornwall
Constituencies of the Parliament of the United Kingdom established in 1558